Pál Kalmár (September 5, 1900 – November 21, 1988) was a Hungarian pop singer who is noted as being the first singer to perform "Gloomy Sunday". He was at the height of his fame in the 1930s and 1940s but continued singing into the 1960s.
Pál Kalmár's musical history is also well documented in Saly Noemi's book A Tangókirály (The Tango King).

Biography
Pál Kalmár was born in Budapest on September 5, 1900, his father was from Jasz-Nagykun-Szolnok county district court and his mother a descendant of the historic Czebe family. He was schooled in the Highlands and eventually obtained a military career in the Royal Hungarian Army. Later, at 19, he became part of the Hungarian comedy theater. In 1935, he worked on the film St. Peter's Umbrella. During the Second World War his career was interrupted but he resumed singing as a full-time job after the war. After a major throat operation in 1968, he permanently lost his voice.

Discography
 Szomorú vasárnap/Gloomy Sunday. (Seress Rezső-Jávor László)
Szeressük egymást gyerekek. (Seress Rezső)
Ha minden véget ér. (Seress Rezső)
Az egyiknek sikerül, a másiknak nem. (Zerkovitz Béla)
Már megettem a kenyerem javát. (Dr. Sándor Jenő-Kellér Dezső)
Drágám, néha téved az ember. (Buday Dénes-Vadnai László)  
Az nem lehet. (Kola József-Szenes Andor)
Emlékszik még kislány? (Zách István-Cz. Nemes Gyula)
Az ember egy léha, könnyelmű senki. (Erdélyi Mihály)
Szívbajok ellen, kisasszony, szedjen tangót! (Rozsnyai Sándor-Harmath Imre)
Balalajka sír az éjben. (Fényes Szabolcs-Mihály István)
Szép vagy, gyönyörű vagy, Magyarország. (Vincze Zsigmond-Kulinyi Ernő)
Maga az első bűnös asszony. (László Imre-Seress Rezső)

Selected filmography
  St. Peter's Umbrella (1935)

See also
 Hungarian pop

1900 births
1988 deaths
20th-century Hungarian male singers